Heriot is a small village in the Moorfoot Hills southeast of Edinburgh, Scotland, within Eildon (part of the Scottish Borders council area, though historically in Midlothian). Connected to the rest of the world primarily through the A7 road, Heriot had a railway station from 1849 until the branch line closures instigated by Beeching caused the track to be uplifted in the 1960s. The Scottish Parliament voted, in 2006, to reinstate the railway, but without a station at Heriot.

The School (as of Sept 2016) has 36 pupils.  There are numerous community groups operating in the village including drama groups, WRI, a community choir and a karate club.

Places near to Heriot include Borthwick, Carcant, Crichton, Fala, Stow of Wedale and Innerleithen.

See also
List of places in the Scottish Borders
List of places in Scotland
Heriot, New Zealand
Heriotdale

External links

Borders RCAHMS record for Heriot parish
RCAHMS record for Heriot Station and Bridge 48
RCAHMS record for Heriot's Dyke
Article on Heriot's Dyke
GENUKI Genealogy: Heriot
Heriot Village Facebook page
Heriot village web pages

Eildon
Villages in the Scottish Borders
Parishes formerly in Midlothian